Babine Lake or Na-taw-bun-kut ("Long Lake") is the longest natural lake in British Columbia, Canada.

It drains northwest into the Babine River, an important tributary of the Skeena.

There are several provincial parks on Babine Lake:
 Babine Lake Marine Provincial Park
 Pendleton Bay site
 Smithers Landing site
 Topley Landing Provincial Park
 Red Bluff Provincial Park

Babine Portage

Babine Portage is a campsite located about 12 km north of the Portage Yekooche Reserve along a gravel road, on the west end of Babine Lake. The name originates from the 19th century, when the site was used as an entry point for canoes portaging to the Hudson's Bay Company post.

In the past, there were five cabins on the east side of the creek and seven on the west side, but in 2003, all but three were ignited by grass fires and burned down.

Although people from Tache, Fort St. James, and Prince George visit the area, it is mostly used by members of Yekooche First Nation, who spend most of the summer there before returning to Portage Reserve in the fall. The lake provides them with salmon and kokanee, while moose, deer and bear hunting can be done nearby around Salt Lake, Frank's Meadow, and a lagoon west of the camp. People also fish at 4 Mile and 6 Mile Creek, east of the camp near Quarter Island. People from Yekooche rely on their catch from Babine Portage for winter food.

An important local tradition at Babine Portage involves t'es-ing up first-time visitors, which means to rub coal on their cheeks to ward off bad weather at the camp. (t'es means charcoal in the Babine language.)

Climate

References

Lakes of British Columbia
Skeena Country
Bulkley Valley
Omineca Country
Babine
Range 5 Coast Land District